Robert Bárány (22 April 1876 – 8 April 1936) was an Austrian-born otologist. He received the 1914 Nobel Prize in Physiology or Medicine for his work on the physiology and pathology of the vestibular apparatus.

Life and career 
Bárány was born in Vienna, Austria-Hungary. He was the eldest of six children of Maria (née Hock), the daughter of a scientist, and Ignác Bárány, born 1842 in Várpalota, Kingdom of Hungary, who was a bank official and estate manager. His father was a Hungarian Jew whose father also was named Ignác Bárány (Bárány Ignác).

He attended medical school at Vienna University, graduating in 1900. As a doctor in Vienna, Bárány was syringing fluid into the external auditory canal of a patient to relieve the patient's dizzy spells. The patient experienced vertigo and nystagmus (involuntary eye movement) when Bárány injected fluid that was too cold. In response, Bárány warmed the fluid for the patient and the patient experienced nystagmus in the opposite direction. Bárány theorized that the endolymph was sinking when it was cool and rising when it was warm, and thus the direction of flow of the endolymph was providing the proprioceptive signal to the vestibular organ. He followed up on this observation with a series of experiments on what he called the caloric reaction. The research resulting from his observations made surgical treatment of vestibular organ diseases possible. Bárány also investigated other aspects of equilibrium control, including the function of the cerebellum. Benign paroxysmal positional vertigo is said to have been first described in medical texts by Bárány.

He served in the Austro-Hungarian Army during World War I as a civilian surgeon and was captured by the Imperial Russian Army. When his Nobel Prize was awarded in 1914, Bárány was in a Russian prisoner of war camp. In response to his receiving the prize, Sigmund Freud wrote in 1915: "The granting of the Nobel Prize to Bárány, whom I refused to take as a pupil some years ago because he seemed to be too abnormal, has aroused sad thoughts about how helpless an individual is about gaining the respect of the crowd." Bárány was released from the prisoner of war camp in 1916 following joint diplomatic efforts from Sweden, Denmark, Norway and The Netherlands and alongside Red Cross. That work was largely driven by the professor of otorhinolaryngology, Gunnar Holmgren, with diplomatic contributions by prince Carl. Bárány was then able to attend the Nobel Prize awards ceremony in 1916, where he was awarded his prize. Virtually as soon as he was awarded the Nobel Prize, in January 1917, he, with the automatic qualification for making such proposals that comes with being a Prize Winner, proposed to the Nobel Committee in Physiology or Medicine that Sigmund Freud should be awarded the Prize. From 1917 until his death he was professor at Uppsala University Faculty of Medicine.

Bárány died shortly before his sixtieth birthday in Uppsala. He was the father of physician and Swedish Royal Academy of Sciences member Ernst Bárány (1910–1991) and grandfather of physicist Anders Bárány, former secretary of the Nobel Committee for Physics. On 9 March 1909, he married Ida Felicitas Berger, born 12 December 1881. He learned Esperanto some time before 1916.

See also 
 Bárány chair
 List of Austrian scientists
 List of famous Austrians
 List of famous Hungarians
 List of Jewish Nobel laureates
 Spatial disorientation
 Instrument flight
 Instrument rating

References

Sources

External links 

  including the Nobel Lecture on September 11, 1916 Some New Methods for Functional Testing of the Vestibular Apparatus and the Cerebellum

1876 births
1936 deaths
Hungarian Nobel laureates
Austrian Nobel laureates
Austro-Hungarian Nobel laureates
Nobel laureates in Physiology or Medicine
Scientists from Vienna
Austrian Jews
Austrian neuroscientists
Jewish otolaryngologists
Austrian otolaryngologists
Austrian Esperantists
Hungarian Esperantists
Swedish Esperantists
Hungarian emigrants to Sweden
Hungarian Jews
Jewish physicians
Swedish Jews
Otolaryngologists
Swedish surgeons
Academic staff of Uppsala University